Janna is an album by cellist Ernst Reijseger with vocalist/poet/performer Mola Sylla and percussionist Serigne C.M. Gueye recorded in 2002 in France and released on the Winter & Winter label.

Reception

In his review for Allmusic, Thom Jurek said "Textures, dynamic, and tones are the musical concerns as they convey these gorgeous songs, poems, and stories without compromise or regard for ceremony. This is deeply, wonderfully, emotionally rendered exploratory music that cannot be classified, thank goodness".

Track listing
All compositions by Mola Sylla except as indicated
 "Jangelma" - 12:42
 "Baba" - 6:42
 "Sàng Xale Man" (Mola Sylla, Traditional) - 7:19
 "Noon" - 7:13
 "Fier" - 7:00
 "Njaarelu Adiye" - 8:32
 "Doxandéem" - 9:22
 "Sicroula" - 8:29

Personnel
Ernst Reijseger - cello, percussion
Mola Sylla - vocals, mbira, kongoma, xalam, nose flute, bejjen
Serigne C.M. Gueye - soruba, djembe, bougarabou, leget

References

Winter & Winter Records albums
Ernst Reijseger albums
2003 albums
World music albums by Dutch artists